Flying Phantom was a tug built in 1981 for the Clyde Shipping Company and based in Greenock in Scotland.  As a consequence of  business takeovers and mergers, by 2001 she was owned by Svitzer Marine Ltd of Middlesbrough, though still based on the Clyde. 

She sank in the River Clyde at Clydebank on 19 December 2007, with the loss of Stephen Humphreys (captain), Robert Cameron (engineer) and Eric Blackley (deckhand) with only Brian Aitchison surviving.  She was one of three tugs assisting the bulk carrier Red Jasmine. On the night of the accident, there was extremely poor visibility, due to heavy fog. 

Following the incident the Marine Accident Investigation Branch carried out a full investigation on the accident, and their report was published in September 2008. The MAIB concluded that failings in the safety regime of the harbour authority Clydeport, as well as operational shortcomings by the tug operator, and lack of an accepted international industry standard for tug tow line emergency release systems all contributed to the capsize of Flying Phantom and the loss of the three crew-members. The vessel was salvaged in January 2008, allowing evidence to be gathered for the MAIB report, and was subsequently scrapped.

Earlier reports that criminal charges had been laid against Clydeport and Svitzer were confirmed on 22 April 2013.
  In October 2013, Svitzer pleaded guilty to breaching health and safety laws, and was fined £1.7 million. In September 2014 Clydeport was also fined.

References

External links

 MAIB investigation of the incident
 Picture of the vessel being lifted, from local shipping blog "Clydesights"

1981 ships
Shipwrecks of Scotland
Ships of the Clyde Shipping Company